Floodland is a children's fantasy novel by Marcus Sedgwick, published on 2 March 2000 by Orion Children's Books. Floodland won the Branford Boase Award in 2001 for an outstanding first published novel.

Plot 

Floodland is set in the near future where most of the United Kingdom is covered by water. She is left alone in the ruins of Norwich but escapes to Eels Island (Ely Cathedral) where she discovers a sinister society run by a strange boy named Dooby. Will she ever find her parents? His first book, Floodland, was published in 2000, and it received the Branford-Boase award for the best debut children's novel of that year. Publishers Weekly said that "Despite some page-turning chapters, Zoe and her story lack the credibility to sustain readers through the contradictory themes and sometimes unimaginative prose."

References

External links 

 Marcus Sedgwick's homepage
 Fantasticfiction entry for Floodland

2000 British novels
British young adult novels
Novels set in Norfolk
Novels set in Cambridgeshire
Norwich
Ely Cathedral
British novellas
British post-apocalyptic novels
Climate change novels
2000 debut novels